Samuel Acheampong (born January 12, 1996) is a Canadian football defensive lineman for the Toronto Argonauts of the Canadian Football League (CFL).

University career 
Acheampong attended Wilfrid Laurier University from 2015 to 2019 and played for the Golden Hawks, while being named a First Team OUA All-Star in his final year.

Professional career 
Acheampong was selected 20th overall by the Toronto Argonauts in the second round of the 2020 CFL Draft. After the cancellation of the 2020 CFL season, he made the team's active roster following training camp in 2021 and played in his first professional game on August 7, 2021. Acheampong recorded his first career sack and a blocked field goal attempt in a Week 13 playoff-clinching win over the BC Lions on October 30, 2021. He played in all 14 regular season games in 2021 where he had 16 defensive tackles and two sacks.

In 2022, Acheampong played in 16 regular season games where he recorded 19 defensive tackles, one special teams tackle, and one sack. He played in both the East Final and 109th Grey Cup and won his first Grey Cup championship following the Argonauts' victory over the Winnipeg Blue Bombers.

Personal life 
Acheampong was born in Brampton, Ontario and started playing football in grade 9.

References

External links 
 Toronto Argonauts bio

1996 births
Living people
Canadian football defensive linemen
Players of Canadian football from Ontario
Sportspeople from Brampton
Toronto Argonauts players
Wilfrid Laurier Golden Hawks football players